Qt (pronounced "cute") is cross-platform software for creating graphical user interfaces as well as cross-platform applications that run on various software and hardware platforms such as Linux, Windows, macOS, Android or embedded systems with little or no change in the underlying codebase while still being a native application with native capabilities and speed.

Qt is currently being developed by The Qt Company, a publicly listed company, and the Qt Project under open-source governance, involving individual developers and organizations working to advance Qt. Qt is available under both commercial licenses and open-source GPL 2.0, GPL 3.0, and LGPL 3.0 licenses.

Purposes and abilities 
Qt is used for developing graphical user interfaces (GUIs) and multi-platform applications that run on all major desktop platforms and most mobile or embedded platforms.
Most GUI programs created with Qt have a native-looking interface, in which case Qt is classified as a widget toolkit. Non-GUI programs can also be developed, such as command-line tools and consoles for servers.  An example of such a non-GUI program using Qt is the Cutelyst web framework.

Qt supports various compilers, including the GCC C++ compiler, the Visual Studio suite, PHP via an extension for PHP5, and has extensive internationalization support. Qt also provides Qt Quick, that includes a declarative scripting language called QML that allows using JavaScript to provide the logic. With Qt Quick, rapid application development for mobile devices became possible, while logic can still be written with native code as well to achieve the best possible performance.

Other features include SQL database access, XML parsing, JSON parsing, thread management and network support.

Qt releases 

The latest version of Qt is 6.4.

Also still supported, for commercial users, are 5.15 LTS, released on 26 May 2020, and 6.2 LTS, released on 30 September 2021 – long-term support (LTS) versions are generally supported for three years, with a commercial license, while 5.15 support was extended to five years, so it is supported for longer or until 26 May 2025. In addition the KDE project provides unofficial support for, at least, Qt 5.15, i.e. not just for commercial users.

Qt in use 
In 2017, the Qt Company estimated a community of about 1 million developers worldwide in over 70 industries.

Desktop UIs 

Graphical user-interfaces and desktop environments that utilize Qt/QML as widget toolkit:
 KDE Plasma, a libre desktop environment for various computing devices
 DDE (Deepin Desktop Environment) of Linux Deepin
 UKUI (Ubuntu Kylin User Interface)
 CutefishDE 
 LXQt (Lightweight X11 Desktop Environment)
 Lumina, a desktop environment designed for BSD-based TrueOS
 Lomiri (formerly Unity8), a convergent desktop environment started by Canonical, maintained by Ubports
 Maui Shell, a DE that also features their own app suite
 Unity 2D, a desktop shell written in Qt and Qml
 Trinity DE, a continuously developed fork based on KDE3
 SDDM, a display manager that is X11 and Wayland compatible written in QML. (This is a display manager and not a desktop environment.)

Embedded and mobile UIs
 Actively developed or maintained
 AsteroidOS, an open source operating system designed for smartwatches
 Avionics, Panasonic's in-flight entertainment system
 Blackberry 10, a touchscreen-based mobile OS by Blackberry Ltd.
 Sailfish OS, a mobile operating system developed by Jolla
 Plasma Mobile, a touch-based GUI developed by KDE
 LuneOS, community-driven successor for Palm/HP webOS
 Nemo Mobile, based on Mer
 Lomiri, formerly known as Unity8, a phone UI developed by Ubports, originally by Canonical
 Tesla Model S in-car UI
 webOS, a multitask operating system from LG for smart devices like TVs and smartwatches
 Sky Q, the home entertainment system of Sky plc
 Available, but inactive
 MeeGo handset & tablet UX
 Qtopia, a system by Nokia for embedded and mobile devices

Applications using Qt 

Many notable open-source or proprietary cross-platform software are using Qt or QML: 

 010 Editor, a commercial hex editor and text editor for Microsoft Windows, Linux and macOS.
 Ableton Live
 Adobe Photoshop Album
 Adobe Photoshop Elements
 AMD's Radeon Software Crimson Edition driver tool application.
 Audacious, a music player for Linux, Microsoft Windows, and other Unix-like operating systems.
 Autodesk Maya
 Autodesk 3ds Max
 Bitcoin Core, the reference bitcoin implementation. Most bitcoin forks also provide the reference GUI.

 Calibre, ebook collection application
 Celestia, real-time 3D simulator of the entire known universe (Qt only available with v1.7.0)
 CryEngine V editor
 DaVinci Resolve, a video editor
 Dolphin (emulator), an emulator for the Wii and GameCube
 Dorico notation software
 Dragonframe stop motion animation software
 EAGLE by CadSoft Computer / Autodesk, an EDA application with schematic capture, PCB layout, auto-router and CAM features
 FreeMat free open source numerical computing environment
 Gambas  free open source BASIC integrated development environment
 GoldenDict
 Google Earth
 Igor Pro, a data analysis software
 Krita graphics editing and digital painting software
 LMMS, a cross-platform music production software
 Mathematica, a mathematical symbolic computation program, sometimes termed a computer algebra system or program, used in many scientific, engineering, mathematical, and computing fields.
 Monero, a privacy-focused cryptocurrency, implements its official desktop wallet software using Qt.
 MuseScore, an open-source, multiplatform notation software
 OBS, a libre cross-platform screencast software
 Orange data mining suite
 ParaView open-source cross-platform application for interactive, scientific visualization
 qBittorrent cross-platform free and open-source BitTorrent client
 QGIS geographic information system
 Qtractor Audio multitrack recorder and editing software
 QuiteRSS Feed Reader
 Retroshare F2F communication platform
 Roblox Studio a game creation tool used on the Roblox platform
 Scribus desktop publishing software
 Sibelius music composition and notation software
 Source 2 engine tools a 3D video game engine developed by Valve
 Stellarium, a planetarium program
 Subsurface, a software for logging and planning scuba dives initially designed and developed by Linus Torvalds
 SuperCollider, an environment and programming language for real-time audio synthesis and algorithmic composition
 Teamviewer, a computer software package for remote control, desktop sharing, online meetings, web conferencing and file transfer between computers
 Telegram, a messaging client available for Windows, Mac and Linux
 VirtualBox OS virtualization software
 VLC media player
 Wireshark, a packet analyzer
 WPS Office
 XaoS, a real-time fractal zoomer
 XnView MP

Organizations using Qt 
Qt is utilized by a wide range of companies and organizations such as

 AMD
 Blizzard Entertainment
 BMW
 Crytek
 Daimler AG
 Electronic Arts
 European Space Agency
 DreamWorks
 LG
 Lucasfilm
 Microsoft
 Panasonic
 Philips
 Robert Bosch GmbH
 Samsung
 Siemens
 Tesla
 Tomtom
 Volvo
 German Air Traffic Control
 HP
 Walt Disney Animation Studios
 Valve
 Nokta

Qt software architecture

Qt concepts 
Qt is built on these key concepts:
Complete abstraction of the GUI When first released, Qt used its own paint engine and controls, emulating the look of the different platforms it runs on when it drew its widgets. This made the porting work easier because very few classes in Qt really depended on the target platform; however, this occasionally led to slight discrepancies where that emulation was imperfect. Recent versions of Qt use the native style APIs of the different platforms, on platforms that have a native widget set, to query metrics and draw most controls, and do not suffer from such issues as often. On some platforms (such as MeeGo and KDE) Qt is the native API. Some other portable graphical toolkits have made different design decisions; for example, wxWidgets uses the toolkits of the target platform for its implementations.
Signals and slots A language construct introduced in Qt for communication between objects which makes it easy to implement the observer pattern while avoiding boilerplate code. The concept is that GUI widgets can send signals containing event information which can be received by other controls using special functions known as slots.
Metaobject compiler The metaobject compiler, termed moc, is a tool that is run on the sources of a Qt program. It interprets certain macros from the C++ code as annotations, and uses them to generate added C++ code with meta information about the classes used in the program. This meta information is used by Qt to provide programming features not available natively in C++: signals and slots, introspection and asynchronous function calls.
Language bindingsQt can be used in several programming languages other than C++, such as Python, Javascript, C# and Rust via language bindings; many languages have bindings for Qt 5 and bindings for Qt 4.

Qt modules 
Starting with Qt 4.0 the framework was split into individual modules. With Qt 5.0 the architecture was modularized even further. Qt is now split into essential and add-on modules.

Qt essentials

Qt add-ons

Editions 
There are four editions of Qt available: Community, Indie Mobile, Professional and Enterprise. The Community version is under the open source licenses, while the Indie Mobile, Professional and Enterprise versions, which contain additional functionality and libraries, e.g. Enterprise Controls are commercially sold by The Qt Company.

Supported platforms 

Qt works on many different platforms; the following are officially supported:

After Nokia opened the Qt source code to the community on Gitorious, various ports appeared. There are also some ports of Qt that may be available, but are not supported anymore. These platforms are listed in List of platforms supported by Qt. See also there for current community support for other lesser known platforms, such as SailfishOS.

Licensing 
Qt is available under the following free software licenses: GPL 2.0, GPL 3.0, LGPL 3.0 and LGPL 2.1 (with Qt special exception). Note that some modules are available only under a GPL license, which means that applications which link to these modules need to comply with that license.

In addition, Qt has always been available under a commercial license, like the Qt Commercial License, that allows developing proprietary applications with no restrictions on licensing.

Qt tools 

Qt comes with its own set of tools to ease cross-platform development, which can otherwise be cumbersome due to different set of development tools.

Qt Creator is a cross-platform IDE for C++ and QML. Qt Designer's GUI layout/design functionality is integrated into the IDE, although Qt Designer can still be started as a standalone tool.

In addition to Qt Creator, Qt provides qmake, a cross-platform build script generation tool that automates the generation of Makefiles for development projects across different platforms.
There are other tools available in Qt, including the Qt Designer interface builder and the Qt Assistant help browser (which are both embedded in Qt Creator), the Qt Linguist translation tool, uic (user interface compiler), and moc (Meta-Object Compiler).

History of Qt

Early developments 
In the summer of 1990, Haavard Nord and Eirik Chambe-Eng (the original developers of Qt and the CEO and President, respectively, of Trolltech) were working together on a database application for ultrasound images written in C++ and running on Mac OS, Unix, and Microsoft Windows. They began development of "Qt" in 1991, three years before the company was incorporated as Quasar Technologies, then changed the name to Troll Tech and then to Trolltech.

The toolkit was called Qt because the letter Q looked appealing in Haavard's Emacs typeface, and "t" was inspired by Xt, the X toolkit.

The first two versions of Qt had only two flavors: Qt/X11 for Unix and Qt/Windows for Windows.

On 20 May 1995 Troll Tech publicly released Qt 0.90 for X11/Linux with the source code under the Qt Free Edition License. This license was viewed as not compliant with the free software definition by Free Software Foundation because, while the source was available, it did not allow the redistribution of modified versions. Trolltech used this license until version 1.45. Controversy erupted around 1998 when it became clear that the K Desktop Environment was going to become one of the leading desktop environments for Linux. As it was based on Qt, many people in the free software movement worried that an essential piece of one of their major operating systems would be proprietary.

The Windows platform was available only under a proprietary license, which meant free/open source applications written in Qt for X11 could not be ported to Windows without purchasing the proprietary edition.

Becoming free software–friendly 
With the release of version 2.0 of the toolkit in mid-1999, the license was changed to the Q Public License (QPL), a free software license, but one regarded by the Free Software Foundation as incompatible with the GPL. Compromises were sought between KDE and Trolltech whereby Qt would not be able to fall under a more restrictive license than the QPL, even if Trolltech was bought out or went bankrupt. This led to the creation of the KDE Free Qt foundation, which guarantees that Qt would fall under a BSD-style license should no free/open source version of Qt be released during 12 months.

In 2000, Qt/X11 2.2 was released under the GPL v2, ending all controversy regarding GPL compatibility.

At the end of 2001, Trolltech released Qt 3.0, which added support for Mac OS X (now known as macOS). The Mac OS X support was available only in the proprietary license until June 2003, when Trolltech released Qt 3.2 with Mac OS X support available under the GPL.

In 2002, members of the KDE on Cygwin project began porting the GPL licensed Qt/X11 code base to Windows. This was in response to Trolltech's refusal to license Qt/Windows under the GPL on the grounds that Windows was not a free/open source software platform. The project achieved reasonable success although it never reached production quality.

This was resolved when Trolltech released Qt 4.0 also for Windows under the GPL in June 2005. Qt 4 supported the same set of platforms in the free software/open source editions as in the proprietary edition, so it is possible, with Qt 4.0 and later releases, to create GPL-licensed free/open source applications using Qt on all supported platforms. The GPL v3 with special exception was later added as an added licensing option. The GPL exception allows the final application to be licensed under various GPL-incompatible free software/open source licenses such as the Mozilla Public License 1.1.

Acquisition by Nokia 
Nokia acquired Trolltech ASA on 17 June 2008 and changed the name first to Qt Software, then to Qt Development Frameworks.

Nokia focused on turning Qt into the main development platform for its devices, including a port to the Symbian S60 platform. Version 1.0 of the Nokia Qt SDK was released on 23 June 2010. The source code was made available over Gitorious, a community oriented git source code repository, with a goal of creating a broader community using and improving Qt.

On 14 January 2009, Qt version 4.5 added another option, the LGPL, to make Qt more attractive for both non-GPL open source projects and closed applications.

In February 2011, Nokia announced its decision to drop Symbian technologies and base their future smartphones on the Windows Phone platform instead (and since then support for that platform has also been dropped). One month later, Nokia announced the sale of Qt's commercial licensing and professional services to Digia, with the immediate goal of taking Qt support to Android, iOS and Windows 8 platforms, and to continue focusing on desktop and embedded development, although Nokia was to remain the main development force behind the framework at that time.

Merging and demerging with Digia 
In March 2011, Nokia sold the commercial licensing part of Qt to Digia, creating Qt Commercial. In August 2012, Digia announced that it would acquire Qt from Nokia. The Qt team at Digia started their work in September 2012. They released Qt 5.0 within a month and newer versions every six months with new features and additional supported platforms.

In September 2014, Digia transferred the Qt business and copyrights to their wholly owned subsidiary, The Qt Company, which owns 25 brands related to Qt. In May 2016, Digia and Qt demerged completely into two independent companies.

The Qt Project and open governance 

Qt 5 was officially released on 19 December 2012. This new version marked a major change in the platform, with hardware-accelerated graphics, QML and JavaScript playing a major role. The traditional C++-only QWidgets continued to be supported, but did not benefit from the performance improvements available through the new architecture. Qt 5 brings significant improvements to the speed and ease of developing user interfaces.

Framework development of Qt 5 moved to open governance at qt-project.org, which made it possible for developers outside Digia to submit patches for review.

Qt contributors 

Aside from The Qt Company, many organizations and individuals using Qt as their development platform participate in the open development of Qt via the Qt Project.

One such Qt contributor is Klarälvdalens Datakonsult AB, a Swedish Qt consulting company. KDAB is involved in many areas, including maintenance of several components.

Together with RIM/BlackBerry, KDAB is maintaining the QNX and BlackBerry 10 ports of Qt.

Another participator is Intel, contributing for example Wayland support. AudioCodes  maintains IBM ClearCase support in Qt Creator.

As a heavy user of Qt, the KDE project submits many patches and features from its developer library KDE Frameworks back to Qt.

See also 
 List of widget toolkits
 Android software development
 iOS SDK
 Wt (web toolkit)

Bibliography 
Qt Wiki provides a comprehensive list of English books about Qt. This is a list of notable books:

References

External links 

 Qt Marketplace
 

 
1992 software
Application programming interfaces
Articles with example C++ code
C++ libraries
Cross-platform software
Cross-platform desktop-apps development
Formerly proprietary software
Free computer libraries
Free software programmed in C++
KDE
Software using the LGPL license
Widget toolkits
X-based libraries